Cochylis triangula is a moth of the family Tortricidae. It is found in China in Guizhou and Yunnan.

The wingspan is 15.5−17 mm. The forewing ground color is pale yellowish white. The hindwings and cilia are grayish white.

Etymology
The specific name is the feminine form of the Latin adjective triangulus (meaning triangular) and refers to the triangular sacculus.

References

Moths described in 2013
Cochylis